UFC Fight Night: Blaydes vs. Aspinall (also known as UFC Fight Night 208 and UFC on ESPN+ 66) was a mixed martial arts event produced by the Ultimate Fighting Championship that took place on July 23, 2022, at The O2 Arena in London, England.

Background
A heavyweight bout between Curtis Blaydes and Tom Aspinall headlined the event.

Former UFC Welterweight Championship challenger Darren Till and Jack Hermansson were originally expected to headline UFC on ESPN: Hermansson vs. Vettori in December 2020, but the middleweight bout was scrapped after Till was injured. They were then expected to meet at this event. In turn, Till pulled out once again due to injury on July 6 and was replaced by Chris Curtis.

Results

Bonus awards 
The following fighters received $50,000 bonuses.
 Fight of the Night: No bonus awarded.
 Performance of the Night: Paddy Pimblett, Nikita Krylov, Molly McCann and Jonathan Pearce

See also 

 List of UFC events
 List of current UFC fighters
 2022 in UFC

References 

UFC Fight Night
2022 in mixed martial arts
2022 sports events in London
2022 in English sport
Mixed martial arts in the United Kingdom
Sport in London
July 2022 sports events in the United Kingdom